Events in the year 1870 in Portugal.

Incumbents
Monarch: Louis I
Prime Ministers: Four different

Events
13 March - Legislative election.
19 May – João Carlos Saldanha de Oliveira Daun, 1st Duke of Saldanha takes over as Prime Minister
29 August – Bernardo de Sá Nogueira de Figueiredo, 1st Marquis of Sá da Bandeira takes over as Prime Minister
18 September - Legislative election
29 October – António José de Ávila, 1st Duke of Ávila and Bolama takes over as Prime Minister

Arts and entertainment

Sports

Births

1 December – Artur Ivens Ferraz, military officer and politician (died 1933)

Deaths

References

 
Years of the 19th century in Portugal
Portugal